Alstonia spectabilis, commonly known as bitterbark, yellowjacket, milky yellowwood, leatherjacket, jackapple, hard milkwood or hard cheesewood, is a medium-sized species of tree in the dogbane family. It is native to eastern Malesia, Melanesia and northern Australia.

Description
The species grows as a tree to 20 m in height. The white flowers are 3.5–5 mm in diameter. The leaves are up to 36 cm long and 12.5 cm wide. The fruits are 20–40 cm long.

Distribution and habitat
The species is distributed from the Philippines, Java, the Moluccas and Lesser Sunda Islands, through New Guinea, the Bismarck Archipelago and the Solomon Islands, to northern Australia, in tropical forest habitats. It is commonly found on lateritic loam and sandstone soils.

Subspecies
 Alstonia spectabilis subsp. spectabilis, Malesia to Melanesia and north Queensland
 Alstonia spectabilis subsp. ophioxyloides, Western Australia and Northern Territory

References

 
spectabilis
Flora of the Philippines
Flora of Indonesia
Flora of New Guinea
Flora of the Northern Territory
Flora of Queensland
Flora of Western Australia
Gentianales of Australia
Trees of Australia
Plants described in 1810
Taxa named by Robert Brown (botanist, born 1773)